Los Queules National Reserve is a national reserve of Chile containing a large patch of Maulino forest which is otherwise very fragmented.

References

National reserves of Chile
Protected areas of Maule Region
Valdivian temperate rainforest